St. Joseph's Church is a historic church at 2202 Avenue K in Galveston, Texas. It is the oldest German Catholic church in Texas and one of the oldest buildings in Galveston.

History
St. Joseph's Church was built upon the recommendation of Bishop John Odin in 1860 and dedicated to St. Joseph. It was added to the National Register in 1976.

See also

National Register of Historic Places listings in Galveston County, Texas
Recorded Texas Historic Landmarks in Galveston County

References

German-American culture in Texas
Roman Catholic churches in Texas
Churches on the National Register of Historic Places in Texas
National Register of Historic Places in Galveston County, Texas
Carpenter Gothic church buildings in Texas
Roman Catholic churches completed in 1860
19th-century Roman Catholic church buildings in the United States
Churches in Galveston, Texas
Roman Catholic Archdiocese of Galveston–Houston
National parishes
Recorded Texas Historic Landmarks